Polmorla is a hamlet just southwest of Wadebridge, Cornwall, England, United Kingdom, map reference SW983715. The Polmorla brook is a tributary of the River Camel, and rises on St Breock Downs.

References

External links

Hamlets in Cornwall